"Setian Massacre" is a single by the American heavy metal band Iced Earth. The two songs on the single (the title-track and "Ten Thousand Strong") are taken from the group's 2007 album, Framing Armageddon: Something Wicked Part 1. Both songs are a part of the rhythm guitarist Jon Schaffer's "Something Wicked" storyline, on which the entire Framing Armageddon album and its follow-up, The Crucible of Man: Something Wicked Part 2, is based.

In 2008, a re-sung version of "Setian Massacre" was included on the single "I Walk Among You". Tim "Ripper" Owens' vocals had been re-recorded by the singer Matt Barlow, whom Owens had originally replaced in 2003.

Track listing

Personnel
Jon Schaffer - guitars, bass guitar, backing vocals
Tim "Ripper" Owens - vocals
Troy Seele - guitar
Brent Smedley - drums

References

External links 
 

2007 singles
Iced Earth songs
2007 songs
Songs written by Jon Schaffer